Daan District is a coastal suburban district in Taichung, Taiwan, upgraded from Da-an Township. It lies between the Dajia river and the Da-an river.

The district's economy is based on rice.

The climate is sub-tropical.

History
In March 1842, during the First Opium War, the brig Ann became shipwrecked near Daan harbour. It had 57 personnel, mostly Indian seacunnies and lascars. Survivors of the wreck, along with the survivors of the Nerbudda shipwreck in September 1841, were executed in Tainan in August 1842.

Administrative divisions
Nanpu, Nanzhuang, Zhongzhuang, Tong'an, Fuxing, Guike, Ding'an, Yong'an, Fuzhu, Haiqi, Xi'an and Songya Villages.

Tourist attractions
 Da'an Coastal Park

References

External links

 

Districts of Taichung